Woodward Career Technical High School is a public high school located in the Bond Hill neighborhood of Cincinnati, Ohio, United States.  It is part of the Cincinnati Public School District. It was founded as one of the first public schools in the United States in 1831.

History

Old Woodward Building 

Woodward was one of the first public schools in the country. The land for the original school was donated by William Woodward and his wife Abigail Cutter in 1826 to provide free education for poor children who could not afford private schooling. Their remains are buried on school grounds in the Over-the-Rhine area of Cincinnati (and it is a fixture of student lore that Abigail's ghost haunts the building). The Woodward Free Grammar School opened on the site in 1831 and was the first free public school in the city. The original two-story school building was replaced in 1855. On the day after his election, President Elect William Howard Taft, who graduated from Woodward High School in 1874, laid the cornerstone of a third building, which opened to students in 1910.

The site is also linked to the Underground Railroad. William Woodward built a home on the site in 1832, where Levi Coffin   and his wife, Catharine, lived from 1856 to 1863. Coffin (known as "The President of the Underground Railroad"), sheltered over one hundred fugitive slaves each year on their way to freedom in Canada. The home was first occupied by Henry Rucher, an early principal and math teacher at the Woodward school, and it was commonly known as the Rucher House. It later served as the Good Samaritan Hospital (still in operation at its later Clifton Heights location). In 1865 it became St. Luke's Hospital, where disabled Civil War soldiers were treated. It was replaced by residential homes in 1874, which were demolished to clear ground for the new Woodward school building in 1907.

The brick, stone, and terra cotta building, designed by Gustav Drach, had some of the most modern facilities of its day, including flush toilets, central heating, and two swimming pools. It is notable for its many Rookwood Pottery drinking fountains and tile fixtures, many of them gifts from student clubs and graduating classes in the early 1900s. Also notable are the stained glass windows of the same period in the main entryway, the largest of which is a memorial mural of "The Landing of William Woodward at Cincinnati in Fall of 1791", which was part of the 1855 construction and was preserved after that building was destroyed.

The building is listed in the Over-the-Rhine (South) Local Historic District    and the Over-the-Rhine National Register Historic District.

Bond Hill 
In 1953 Woodward High School moved to a new location in Bond Hill, and the older building was designated Abigail Cutter Junior High School until the School for Creative and Performing Arts took over the entire facility in 1977. Woodward High School has since moved four times, in addition to opening a secondary campus near its current location on Reading Road.

Woodward High School won the Ohio High School Athletic Association State Championships for baseball in 1931 and 1945 and for basketball in 1988.

In August 2006, the City of Cincinnati opened Woodward Career Technical High School, which features a mixture of college-preparatory and vocational education. With the new addition, the original campus was now called Woodward Traditional High School.

In June 2011, demolition of the "Woodward Traditional High School" building was begun and the original 1953 Woodward High School building has now been completely demolished.  A synthetic turf football field, baseball field, and fieldhouse will be built in place on the 1953 building.

Notable people

References

External links 
Old Woodward : a memorial relating to Woodward High School, 1831–1836, and Woodward College, 1836–1851, in the city of Cincinnati
Woodward Career Technical High School

1831 establishments in Ohio
High schools in Hamilton County, Ohio
Cincinnati Public Schools
Public high schools in Ohio
Educational institutions established in 1831
Rookwood Pottery Company